Thomson Summit is a mostly snow-covered mountain rising to 1,515 m between Mount Goodman and Mount Chandler in the Behrendt Mountains, Palmer Land.  These mountains were visited during the 1984–85 season by a United States Antarctic Research Program (USARP) geological party led by Peter D. Rowley of the U.S. Geological Survey.  On his suggestion, named by Advisory Committee on Antarctic Names (US-ACAN), 1986, after Janet Wendy Thomson, British Antarctic Survey (BAS) geologist; British exchange scientist with the Rowley party who climbed to the summit of this mountain; and who was from 1992, Head of Mapping and Geographic Information Centre, BAS.

References

Mountains of Palmer Land